= Fedar Creek =

Stream in Idaho, U.S.

Coordinates: 48°39′32″N 116°56′17″W

Fedar Creek is a stream in the U.S. state of Idaho. It is a tributary of Granite Creek.

Fedar Creek was named after Charles Fedar, a local trapper.
